Vyacheslav Grigoryev (born 6 April 1967) is a Kazakhstani foil fencer. He competed for the Unified Team at the 1992 Summer Olympics and for Kazakhstan at the 1996 Summer Olympics.

References

External links
 

1967 births
Living people
Kazakhstani male foil fencers
Olympic fencers of Kazakhstan
Olympic fencers of the Unified Team
Fencers at the 1992 Summer Olympics
Fencers at the 1996 Summer Olympics
Fencers at the 1994 Asian Games
Asian Games competitors for Kazakhstan